Steven Cuitlahuac Melendez (born October 19, 1945) is an American film and television director, producer and animator. He is the second son of Peanuts animator Bill Melendez.

He was born in Los Angeles where he gained his early experience in film as an editor with Bill Melendez Productions working on an early Peanuts special, Babar the Elephant, a suite of commercials and the feature film A Boy Named Charlie Brown.

Melendez moved to London in 1970 to establish the studio's European office where he produced numerous television and cinema commercials, the feature film Dick Deadeye, and the animated adaptation of The Lion, the Witch and the Wardrobe, for which he won an Emmy.

References

External links
 Bill Melendez Productions Inc.
 
 Interview British Entertainment History Project

1945 births
American animators
American expatriates in the United Kingdom
American film directors
American film directors of Mexican descent
American film producers
American television directors
American television producers
American animated film directors
American animated film producers
Living people
Primetime Emmy Award winners